Proleucinodes impuralis is a moth in the family Crambidae. It was described by Cajetan Felder, Rudolf Felder and Alois Friedrich Rogenhofer in 1875. It is found on Hispaniola.

References

Spilomelinae
Moths described in 1875